Mian Qaleh or Miyan Qaleh or Miyanqaleh may refer to:
 Mian Qaleh, Chaharmahal and Bakhtiari
 Mian Qaleh, Fars
 Mian Qaleh, Ilam
 Mian Qaleh, Kermanshah

See also
 Qaleh-ye Mian